The Patterson Law Office is located in Central City, Nebraska. It is a false-front building of frame construction built in 1872.

History and description

The Patterson Law Office was built in the same year as John Patterson, a native of Ireland, came to Lone Tree (now Central City), Nebraska.  Patterson built a law practice in Merrick County housed in this building. He was a well-known trial lawyer and county attorney, played an important role in the development of Central City and Merrick County, and served as county superintendent of schools.

The law office is a one-story, false-fronted building with gable roof. It rests on a stone foundation and exhibits Greek Revival elements in the door, window, pilaster and cornice detailing.  It has two rooms lined with wainscot paneling.

The building is historically significant for several reasons. It is one of the earliest known false-frame commercial buildings in Nebraska  predating the majority of 19th century commercial buildings in Nebraska by nearly 20 years. It is associated with a significant figure,  John Patterson, in the development of Central City and Merrick County. It also has relationships to Wright Morris appearing in his literary works.

See also

Cahow Barber Shop
Wright Morris Boyhood House

References

External links

Tree Literary Society
Merrick County

Buildings and structures in Merrick County, Nebraska
Commercial buildings completed in 1872
Commercial buildings on the National Register of Historic Places in Nebraska
National Register of Historic Places in Merrick County, Nebraska
Western false front architecture
Law offices
Legal history of Nebraska